Aneded is one of the woredas in the Amhara Region of Ethiopia. Part of the Misraq Gojjam Zone, Aneded is bordered on the south by the Abay River which separates it from the Oromia Region, on the southwest by Baso Liben, on the northwest by Guzamn, on the north by Sinan, and on the east by Awabel. Towns in Awabel include Amber. Aneded was part of Awabel woreda.

Demographics
Based on the 2007 national census conducted by the Central Statistical Agency of Ethiopia (CSA), this woreda has a total population of 91,224, of whom 45,408 are men and 45,816 women; 1,778 or 1.95% are urban inhabitants. The majority of the inhabitants practiced Ethiopian Orthodox Christianity, with 98.87% reporting that as their religion, while 1.1% of the population said they were Muslim.

References

Districts of Amhara Region